Joseph Charles Tommasi (April 15, 1951 – August 15, 1975) was an American Neo-Nazi who founded the National Socialist Liberation Front. He advocated extremism and armed guerrilla warfare against the U.S. government and what he called its "Jewish power structure." Tommasi wanted anarchy and lawlessness so that the "system" could be attacked without protection. Tommasi was derisively nicknamed "Tomato Joe" by rival neo-Nazis because of his Italian heritage and "less than Nordic complexion."

Politics
Influenced by William Luther Pierce, Tommasi first rose to prominence as a young leader within the National Socialist White People's Party (NSWPP, earlier known as the American Nazi Party) in Arlington County, Virginia.

In 1969, Tommasi launched the National Socialist Liberation Front (NSLF) as a youth wing of the American Nazi Party. In 1970, David Duke joined the organization.

In February 1972, Irv Rubin, a Jewish militant of the Jewish Defense League, was arrested after firing at Tommasi.

The NSWPP had splintered following the 1967 murder of George Lincoln Rockwell, and Tommasi frequently found himself at odds with Rockwell's successor, Matthias Koehl. Koehl, a strait-laced follower of Adolf Hitler, objected to Tommasi's radical viewpoints, as well as his personal habits, which included smoking marijuana, wearing long hair, listening to rock and roll and inviting a girlfriend for sex at NSWPP headquarters. These led to Tommasi being ejected from the NSWPP in 1973.

In March 1974, Tommasi launched the NSLF as a separate organization. The group attracted many of the younger and more radical members of the NSWPP. It used propaganda such as pictures showing the twisted wreckage of a Bank of America branch.

Tommasi sought membership among white college students who felt alienated by both the radical leftist movement as well as the mainstream conservative right. However, Tommasi had not given up trying to regain control of the NSWPP.

Death
On August 15, 1975, Tommasi was killed by a single bullet to the head in front of the headquarters of the NSWPP in El Monte, California. Numerous weapons were found at the headquarters, including a gun that had been recently fired. David Rust, who was with Tommasi at the time, stated that someone had directed an obscene gesture towards them. Witnesses said that Tommasi walked into the front yard carrying a club and got into an argument. One NSWPP member allegedly told him that if he came any closer, he would be shot. Jerry Keith Jones, 18 years old, was suspected in the murder. 

Tommasi was buried at Rose Hills Memorial Park.

Legacy
Tommasi's life inspired fellow neo-Nazi James Mason to revive the NSLF in the early 1980s as a leaderless "philosophical concept or a state of mind" called Universal Order and to resurrect  Tommasi's "Siege" periodical.

Publications
Building the revolutionary party Chillicothe, Ohio : National Socialist Liberation Front
 POLITICAL TERROR (1974 leaflet)

References

External links
 The Post-war Paths of Occult National Socialism: From Rockwell and Madole to Manson by Jeffrey Kaplan

1951 births
1975 deaths
20th-century far-right politicians in the United States
American people of Italian descent
Leaders of political parties in the United States
American murder victims
Deaths by firearm in California
 1975 murders in the United States
American Nazi Party members